Sir Donald Charles Cameron,  (19 November 1879 – 19 November 1960) was an Australian politician and soldier. He was a member of the Australian House of Representatives as the Nationalist Party of Australia member for Brisbane from 1919 to 1931 and as the United Australia Party member for Lilley from 1934 to 1937.

Early life and military career
Born in Brisbane, the son of a grazier, he was educated at Toowoomba Grammar School and Brisbane Grammar School. He served with the Queensland Imperial Bushmen in the Second Boer War and with American forces in China during the Boxer Rebellion. He managed the family property, Kensington Downs, along with his brothers between 1902 and 1914, when he enlisted in World War I. He was shot through the liver and lung at the Battle of Gallipoli, and finished the First World War as a lieutenant colonel in command of the 5th Light Horse Regiment. He was mentioned in despatches, received the Order of the Nile, and was appointed a Companion of the Order of St Michael and St George for his war service.

Politics
In 1919 he won the seat of Brisbane for the Nationalist Party of Australia, holding it until he was defeated by the Australian Labor Party in 1931. In 1934 he won the nearby seat of Lilley, but retired in 1937. In 1932 he was made a Knight Commander of the Order of St Michael and St George.

Later life
During World War II, Cameron was chairman of the New South Wales recruiting committee for the Royal Australian Air Force. He died on 19 November 1960 and was cremated; his ashes were buried in the family cemetery on Home Creek Station.

References

1879 births
1960 deaths
Australian Army officers
Australian military personnel of the Second Boer War
Australian military personnel of World War I
Australian Companions of the Distinguished Service Order
Australian Knights Commander of the Order of St Michael and St George
Australian politicians awarded knighthoods
Nationalist Party of Australia members of the Parliament of Australia
Members of the Australian House of Representatives
Members of the Australian House of Representatives for Brisbane
Members of the Australian House of Representatives for Lilley
United Australia Party members of the Parliament of Australia
20th-century Australian politicians
American military personnel of the Boxer Rebellion